Piptanthus is a genus of flowering plants in the family Fabaceae, and the subfamily Faboideae. It is most closely related to the genera Anagyris, Thermopsis (Asiatic spp.) and Vuralia.

Species
Piptanthus comprises the following species:

 Piptanthus nepalensis is native to Burma, Bhutan, China, India, and Nepal. It is a shrub which is variable in morphology, especially in the arrangement of hairs on its leaves and other parts, so it has frequently been divided into multiple species. This Himalayan shrub is evergreen in mild sheltered sites, semi-evergreen elsewhere, losing its leaves in hard frost but soon recovering again in spring. The growth is upright and flexible, allowing plants to be trained on warm walls where they are sheltered and flower more profusely. The blooms are large and bright yellow, like those of laburnum but in short upright clusters. Although good drainage is important, make sure plants are watered in summer to prevent sudden die-back.
 Piptanthus tomentosus is endemic to China. It can be distinguished from P. nepalensis by the coating of reddish hairs on its fruit.

References

Sophoreae
Fabaceae genera